The 2011 GP Miguel Induráin was the 58th edition of the GP Miguel Induráin cycle race and was held on 2 April 2011. The race started and finished in Estella. The race was won by Samuel Sánchez.

General classification

References

2011
2011 UCI Europe Tour
2011 in Spanish road cycling